Bandung metropolitan area, officially Bandung Basin (Cekungan Bandung) or Greater Bandung (Bandung Raya), is a metropolitan area surrounding the city of Bandung, West Java, Indonesia.  It was home to 8.873 million people in mid 2021 and is composed of regencies and cities previously part of the Dutch East Indies era "Central Priangan Residency" administration.

Due to ongoing development in urban areas between Bandung, Kertajati International Airport, Aerotropolis and Patimban International Seaport, the West Java provincial government and the Regional Planning Board (BAPPEDA) has prepared and publicized a blueprint for a newly defined (extended) Bandung Metropolitan area with a total area more than 5,500 km2 and a population greater than 11 million people.

Location
Bandung is located in a mountainous plateau region in the central portion of West Java province and has the third highest population of any metropolitan area in Indonesia.

Western Java urban corridor
The Bandung metropolitan area begins less than 20 km from the eastern edge of the metropolitan area of Greater Jakarta ("Jabodetabek") near Cianjur city, and is adjacent (contiguous) with the Jabodetabekjur-Cirangkarta definition for Jakarta's extended metropolitan area (250 km or so long) at its northern border with Purwakarta Regency. Stretching from Serang Regency in Banten Province to include Greater Bandung, this relatively narrow urban corridor  hemmed in by volcanoes is home to estimated 50 million people as of 2020, or a third of the islands population and a bit less than a fifth of the entire nation.

Definition
The Bandung Metropolitan area was officially defined as covering Bandung Regency and West Bandung Regency (which until 2007 was part of Bandung Regency), plus part (5 districts) of Sumedang Regency, together with the cities of Bandung and Cimahi.

As subsequently extended, the new metropolitan region includes the entire Sumedang Regency with parts of Subang Regency and Majalengka Regency; and it borders the Cirebon metropolitan area. Together, the two metro areas comprise over 14 million people Sources: (Budan Pusat Statistik 2010, 2015 Census Indonesia)
 https://web.archive.org/web/20101113175446/http://www.bps.go.id/hasilSP2010/jabar/3211.pdf (for kecamatan)
 https://web.archive.org/web/20120628013636/http://www.bps.go.id/aboutus.php?sp=0&kota=32 Tabel Hasil Sensus Penduduk 2010 Provinsi JAWA BARAT (for all others)
 https://web.archive.org/web/20131014170450/http://www.jabarprov.go.id/index.php/subMenu/75 Sumber : Database SIAK Provinsi Jawa Barat Tahun 2011
 (BPS Jabar 2015) Satudata Jawa Barat BPS Jumlah Penduduk Kabupaten/ Kota di Jawa Barat Tahun 2010 - 2015
 Note that area figures in Indonesia are frequently updated as the country is seismically and volcanically very active, and land subsidence due to changes in land use and population pressures. 3 kecamatan data were not updated, assuming no changes to older data from 2010 data.

See also
 List of metropolitan areas in Indonesia
 Greater Jakarta
 Gerbangkertosusila

References

West Java
Metropolitan areas of Indonesia